Friends of the National Libraries (FNL) is a British registered charity founded in 1931 that supports the British Library, the National Library of Scotland and the National Library of Wales and other libraries in the UK recognised as being of national importance.

The FNL awards grants to national, regional and specialist collecting institutions enabling them to acquire rare books, manuscripts, literary archives, fine bindings and estate archives that would otherwise be lost to the public domain and, in very many cases, to the nation.  

The history of FNL is an illustrious one. The ‘roll call’ of items and collections that have been saved with its help is extraordinary.  It includes manuscript copies of works by our most famous authors, literary archives, family and estate archives of pre-eminent importance, scientific works, musical manuscripts and fine bindings.  

In November 2021 FNL announced that it had successfully raised over £15 million to acquire the Honresfield Library for the nation. This library was formed towards the end of the 19th century by William Law (1836-1901), a Rochdale mill owner, who created an exceptional collection of English and Scottish manuscripts and printed books which had the Brontës at its heart, as well as manuscripts in the hands of Jane Austen, Robert Burns and Sir Walter Scott and a significant collection of printed books. It has been largely inaccessible for the last 80 years. 

When the sale of the library in three tranches was announced in May 2021, FNL successfully encouraged Sotheby’s, the agents for the vendors, to postpone the sale of the first tranche planned for July 2021 in order to give FNL the opportunity to purchase the entire collection outright on behalf of appropriate recipient libraries within the UK. 

A private library of English literature of such significance has not been placed on the open market for many decades, or is ever likely to appear again.

Taking a UK-wide approach to acquiring the Honresfield Library, FNL, along with a consortium of libraries and museums, worked to raise the substantial funds needed to acquire the Honresfield Library.  FNL succeeded in raising the £15m required in under 6 months.  It acquired the collection and has donated every single manuscript and book to UK institutions: over 50 institutions across the UK will benefit from this distributed national collection.  The manuscripts will be donated to eight institutions, within 4 author groups:

Charlotte, Emily and Anne Brontë:
The Brontë Parsonage Museum, Haworth;  The British Library, London and Yorkshire; The Brotherton Library, University of Leeds 

Jane Austen:
The Bodleian Library, Oxford:  Jane Austen’s House, Chawton

Sir Walter Scott:
The National Library of Scotland, Edinburgh and Glasgow;  Abbotsford: The Home of Walter Scott, Melrose, Scotland.

Robert Burns: 
The National Library of Scotland;  The Robert Burns Birthplace Museum, Alloway (National Trust for Scotland)

The partners have exciting plans for digitisation, exhibitions, education and outreach and also research projects.  

Some 50 institutions in all four home nations will benefit from donations of printed books, of which the collection held over 1,400.

FNL has ensured that this outstanding collection is now called the Blavatnik Honresfield Library in recognition of the lead donor to the campaign.  It will remain permanently in the public domain and will never be lost to overseas institutions or to private collections that are not accessible to the public

The success of the campaign to save the library was made possible by thousands of generous donors. The lead donor was the Blavatnik Family Foundation and the campaigns major donor was the National Heritage Memorial Fund.  Many other trusts and foundations generously donated to the appeal as did thousands of individuals in the UK and overseas.  

FNL is supported by its many members, whose subscriptions enable it to award more acquisition grants every year than would otherwise be possible.

External links 

British Library
Cultural charities based in the United Kingdom
Organizations established in 1931
Arts organisations based in the United Kingdom